WHRM may refer to:

 WHRM (FM), a radio station (90.9 FM) licensed to serve Wausau, Wisconsin, United States
 WHRM-TV, a television station (channel 24, virtual 20) licensed to serve Wausau, Wisconsin